Franz Theodor Wolf (February 13, 1841 - June 22, 1924) was a German naturalist who studied the Galápagos Islands during the late nineteenth century. Wolf Island (Wenman Island) is named after him. The peak Volcán Wolf on Isabela Island is also named after him. He was born at Bartholomä (in the Ostalbkreis).

He published his Ein Besuch der Galápagos-Inseln, Sammlung von Vortraegen fuer das deutsche Volk (“A Visit to the Galápagos Islands: A Collection of Presentations for the German People”) in 1892. His observations also include notes on the human population on the islands.

He had performed a geologic survey of mainland Ecuador, but unfortunately his collections were lost in storage.

Wolf’s observations, which became the standard interpretation of island geology, depicted the islands as exposed tops of oceanic volcanoes with a distinctly different composition from the volcanic mountains of South America.

As a botanist he described or co-described numerous species within the genus Potentilla.

He died in Dresden.

References

External links
 
Observations of Theodor Wolf

1841 births
1924 deaths
People from Ostalbkreis
People from the Kingdom of Württemberg
Galápagos Islands
German explorers
20th-century German geologists
German naturalists
19th-century German botanists
19th-century German geologists